In late 19th and early 20th centuries, sheep farming expanded across the Patagonian grasslands making the southern regions of Argentina and Chile one of the world's foremost sheep farming areas. The sheep farming boom attracted thousands of immigrants from Chiloé and Europe to southern Patagonia. Early sheep farming in Patagonia was oriented towards wool production but changed over time with the development of industrial refrigerators towards meat export. Besides altering the demographic and economic outlook of Southern Patagonia the sheep farming boom also changed the steppe ecosystem.

Sheep farming in Patagonia was carried out in an estancia system. Each of these estancias was administered from a casco central (a central complex of buildings) where administrators, foremen and workers lived.

Sociedad Explotadora de Magallanes possessed more than 200,000 sheep by 1901.

Development

In 1843 Chile established a colony in Brunswick Peninsula to assert sovereignty over the strategic Strait of Magellan. Early sheep herding activity in the Chilean colony was very modest. The first men to realize the potential for large-scale sheep herding in the lands around the Strait of Magellan were a group of British immigrants that settled in Punta Arenas in the 1870s.

The first successful attempt at sheep farming in the Straits of Magellan is credited to the Englishman Henry Reynard who raised sheep in 1877 on Isabel Island. These sheep were brought to the Straits of Magellan by Chilean governor Diego Dublé Almeyda who travelled specifically for that purpose to the Falkland Islands in the corvette Chacabuco in 1876. In Port Stanley he bought 300 sheep and back in Chile he sold them to Henry Reynard. By 1878 this first sheep-raising experiment was considered a success and it created a huge demand for land among individuals who attempted to establish their own sheep-raising businesses.

Beyond the Strait of Magellan
All the best sheep-herding areas along the Strait had been leased or reserved by 1884. At this point the governor of the Argentine territory of Santa Cruz Carlos María Moyano travelled to the Falkland Islands where he promised cheap rental of land for any farmer that moved in to the scarcely populated territory. A group of five settlers who arrived this way, Henry Jamieson, John Hamilton, William Saunders, Mac Clain and George Mac George set up a plan to quickly set up large sheep farms. These men went in 1888 to Buenos Aires and then to Río Negro where they purchased thousands of sheep, horses and supplies. All sheep, herders, horses and supplies gathered at the Argentine outpost of Fortín Conesa from where they departed south on September 8. The herders followed a route along the coast similar to modern National Route 3 for hundreds of kilometers until reaching their land grants in the territory of Santa Cruz. As movement of livestock of this magnitude was unheard of the region the feat was later baptised as El Gran Arreo or The Great Herding by writer José Salvador Borerro Rivera.

In Chile sheep farming expanded from the Strait of Magellan to the area around Última Esperanza Sound where in 1893 that the first estancia was established. Attempts to establish a cattle farming business by entrepreneur Daniel Cruz Ramírez around 1899 in Muñoz Gamero Peninsula failed given the humid climate and swampy terrain.

Chilean auctions of 1903–1906
When most of the land leases around the Strait of Magellan expired around 1902 the Chilean government decided to auction the lands. This was possibly due to pressure from commercial interests in Valparaíso and Santiago that had come to realize how profitable sheep raising in Magallanes was. Chilean and foreign entrepreneurs that had leased the lands sought to be able to purchase the land directly from the state but were unsuccessful in their attempts. The first actions begun on March 20, 1903.

Sheep farms around Última Esperanza Sound was initially unaffected by the auctions but on March 15, 1905, these lands too were auctioned. Sociedad Explotadora de Tierra del Fuego became the main landowner in the area establishing its local estancia headquarters in Cerro Castillo.

When the auctions finished in September 1906 three companies owned by a total of 18 individuals owned most of the land suitable for sheep farming around the Strait. Many of the early sheep farming pioneers were not able to continue in business as owners, but some did. The concentration of land in a few properties gave land tenure in Magallanes as a latifundium structure. This increased concentration of land ownership faced criticism from authors like Lautaro Navarro who in 1908 wrote "...what was appropriate for the Territory was subivision [of land into smaller properties] as means to increase the population and give land access to small capitalists who whished to establish estancias in their own lands". With particular reference to the Última Esperanza area Swedish explorer Carl Skottsberg was also critical of the auctions and the resulting changes in land property, in his book The Wilds of Patagonia (1911) he wrote: "I can hardly believe that the revolution was favourable to Chile's interests, and I daresay that is a rather ugly page in the history of a so-called democratic people. Men who knew Patagonia before and now say that the "star of Ultima Esperanza sank when the all-mighty company became its master.".

Interesting article in Berkshire History Society about the Waldron and Payne families of Lambourn and Peasemore House who were some of the early western settlers https://berksfhs.org/sheep-farming-in-patagonia/ They founded "The Patagonian Wool Company".

End of the boom
In the 1910s the economy of Magallanes faced several challenges such as the decline in sea traffic as a result of the opening of Panama Canal in 1914 and the establishing of customs in Punta Arenas. In 1920, in the aftermath of the First World War, the price of wool had dropped significantly provoking an economic crisis in sheep-breeding Argentine Patagonia. The sheep farming economy came to face increased social unrest and addition to competition from New Zealand sheep farmers. After recognising the concentrated land tenure as a cause of social tensions Chilean authorities begun in the 1930s efforts to redistribute land and diversify the economy. Finally, in the 1950s oil began to be extracted from oil platforms in the Strait of Magellan effectively ending the dependence on sheep farming for the local economy.

Ecological impact

The sheep farming boom altered not only the demographic and economic outlook of Southern Patagonia, but also changed the steppe ecosystem. Research suggests that sheep excrement might have caused eutrophication of lagoons like Potrok Aike, and sheep might also have caused considerable erosion. The Strait of Magellan and the Atlantic coast were covered by natural grasslands so no clearing of forests occurred during the introduction of sheep.

See also
Amazon rubber boom
Argentine beef
New Zealand wool boom
Patagonia rebelde

Notes

References

History of agriculture in Argentina
History of agriculture in Chile
Commodity booms
History of Patagonia
History of Magallanes Region
Sheep farming in Argentina
Sheep farming in Chile